Interstate 75 (I-75) in the US state of Tennessee runs from Chattanooga to Jellico by way of Knoxville. I-75 enters the East Tennessee region from Georgia, following the Tennessee Valley all the way through Knoxville to near Rocky Top, then climbs into the Cumberland Mountains before crossing over into Kentucky at Jellico.

Between Chattanooga and Knoxville, I-75 follows the route of U.S. Route 11 (US 11), and, from Knoxville into Kentucky, it follows the route of US 25W. Beginning in Chattanooga, I-75 follows the route of US 41 for the rest of the length to its southern terminus in Miami.

Route description

Chattanooga

I-75 enters Tennessee on the eastern side of East Ridge, a southern suburb of Chattanooga. Less than  into Tennessee is an interchange with US 41 (unsigned US 76). About  later, at exit 2, is a three-way interchange with the eastern terminus of I-24, which runs west into downtown Chattanooga and to Nashville. At this interchange, I-75 turns northeast, running along the eastern boundary of Chattanooga. Almost  later is an interchange with State Route 320 (SR 320), which connects to East Brainerd, and, about a half mile later is a three-way interchange with the southern terminus of SR 153, a controlled-access highway that runs northwest to the Chattanooga Metropolitan Airport and crosses the Tennessee River on the Chickamauga Dam. Accessible from the northbound lanes at this interchange is Hamilton Place Boulevard, a connector to Hamilton Place. The southbound lanes of I-75 are also accessible from an entrance ramp from this road. At this point, I-75 enters a large commercial area dominated by Hamilton Place and has an interchange with Shallowford Road about  later. A few miles later, at exit 7, I-75 has an interchange with US 11 southbound, US 64 westbound, and SR 317 westbound and begins a concurrency with these respective routes. Turning slightly northeast, the Interstate crosses a Norfolk Southern Railway, and, at exit 9, SR 317 splits off to the east. I-75 then crosses a steep ridge, passing between the Enterprise South Industrial Park to the west and Collegedale to the east. A few miles later, in Ooltewah, US 11/US 64 split off at exit 11, where the route narrows to six lanes. I-75 then turns northwest and narrows to four lanes.

Bradley to Loudon counties

A few miles later, I-75 begins a steep ascent up the western slope of White Oak Mountain, where the northbound lanes receive a truck climbing lane. At this point, the Interstate turns northeast and, for the next , traverses east northeast over the top of White Oak Mountain, where it crosses into Bradley County. I-75 then runs for the next several miles through a predominantly wooded and agricultural area and crossing a few ridges before reaching Cleveland at an interchange with APD-40 eastbound (US 64 Bypass [US 64 Byp.]), a bypass and connector to US 64. Running along the western edge of Cleveland, I-75 has an interchange with SR 60 about  later, also crossing Candies Creek Ridge at this location, and, less than  later, an interchange with Paul Huff Parkway, a major thoroughfare along the northern part of Cleveland. The Interstate then leaves Cleveland and enters rural northern Bradley County, running northeast. Nearly the entirety of this section also contains an extremely wide median, mostly separated by trees. In some locations, the north and southbound lanes are as much as a half mile apart.

This area is extremely susceptible to fog hazards, which obscures the visibility of drivers, and several bad accidents have occurred on this section as a result. Running through mostly wooded and agricultural areas, I-75 reaches Athens about  later and has an interchange with SR 30, a major east–west corridor in East Tennessee. Running through northern McMinn County, the Interstate passes near several unincorporated communities and has interchanges with several secondary state highways. Around milemarker 58, I-75 enters Monroe County and, a few miles later, passes near the town of Sweetwater, containing an interchange with SR 68, another major primary state highway. A few miles later, I-75 crosses into Loudon County. At exit 72 is an interchange with SR 72, which connects to Loudon, and, a few miles later, the highway crosses the Tennessee River on the Mitchell W. Stout Memorial Bridges. I-75 then enters a predominantly commercial and residential area and has an interchange with US 321 and SR 95 in Lenoir City. These routes also connect to Oak Ridge and Maryville. Curving slightly to the west and then again to the east, I-75 reaches an interchange with I-40 westbound about  later, where it begins a concurrency with I-40, and the combined routes widen to six lanes.

Knoxville

Running approximately east-northeast, the two Interstates pass through the western suburbs of Knoxville, including Farragut and West Knoxville. Along this concurrency, exits are numbered according to I-40 mileage. At exit 374 is an interchange with SR 131 (Lovell Road), where the highway widens to eight lanes, and, less than  later is a four-way interchange with the Pellissippi Parkway (SR 162 westbound, I-140 eastbound), which connects to Oak Ridge to the west and Maryville to the east. At exit 380 is an interchange with US 11/US 70 (Kingston Pike), which connects to the West Hills neighborhood and West Town Mall. This section is the most heavily traveled section of highway in Tennessee, with an annual average daily traffic (AADT) volume of more than 210,000 vehicles. About  later, at an interchange with the western terminus of I-640, the northern bypass around Downtown Knoxville, I-75 splits north off of I-40 and onto a concurrency with I-640. Along this concurrency, exits are numbered according to I-640 mileage. Heading north, the Interstates come to an interchange with SR 62 (Western Avenue) about  later. About  later is a complicated interchange with I-275 southbound, the former route of I-75, and US 25W, where I-75 splits off and turns northwest.

Clinch River Valley and Cumberland Mountains
Leaving Knoxville, I-75 runs north northwest, crossing several paralleling ridges of the Ridge-and-Valley Appalachians. The terrain for the next  of I-75 north of Knoxville is characterized mostly by a slight downhill grade. At exit 112 in Powell, I-75 once again has an interchange with SR 131, and the Interstate narrows from six to four lanes. Entering a rural area, I-75 runs along a creek valley for the next several miles that bisects several ridges in a crooked and hazardous segment marked by several S-curves. Maintaining its north-northwesterly direction, I-75 crosses into Anderson County. Beyond this section, the Cumberland Mountains become visible in the distance. At exit 122, the Interstate has an interchange with SR 61 near Clinton. I-75 then descends sharply into a valley, crossing the Clinch River a few miles later. About  later, near the community of Rocky Top, I-75 has interchanges with US 441 and US 25W, beginning a concurrency with the latter. The Interstate then crosses into Campbell County.

For approximately the last  in Tennessee, I-75 begins a series of three major ascents up the Cumberland Mountains. Although this stretch of highway is considered to be scenic, it is one of the most hazardous stretches, which is characterized by steep ascents (northbound) and steep downhill grades (southbound). The Interstate then begins a second ascent, which is steeper than the first ascent, adding a truck climbing lane going northbound. About  later, the highway levels out onto a plateau and the truck lane terminates. Less than  later, SR 63 departs near the unincorporated community of Pioneer. Traveling through a further sparsely populated rural area marked by dense woodlands, I-75 remains relatively flat for the next few miles before beginning its final major ascent, this time ascending Jellico Mountain, which in turn is part of the Pine Mountain subrange, and adding a truck climbing lane for the final time. I-75 curves sharply to the northeast, and, about  later, it reaches the peak of Jellico Mountain, where the truck lane ends for the final time. I-75 remains at the peak of Jellico Mountain for approximately the next  on a segment marked by rolling hills, before beginning the transition into the Cumberland Plateau region. About  later, it enters the city of Jellico where it has an interchange with US 25W. For the next mile or so, it has a slight uphill grade before entering the hilly terrain of Cumberland Plateau in Kentucky.

History

Early history
The first two segments that became I-75 in Tennessee were located in Knoxville and Chattanooga. The segment of this route that became I-75 was located between Unaka Street and a cloverleaf interchange that became the split between I-75 (now I-275) and I-40. This route, which was initially known as the Summit Bypass, opened to traffic on July 23, 1954, and was constructed as a bypass around a one-lane railroad tunnel in Collegedale that had been the site of many traffic accidents.

Construction of the first original section of I-75 in Tennessee began in late 1956 with short extension of the Summit Bypass. Additional segments in Chattanooga and Knoxville were under construction by 1958. The interchange with I-24 and the segment extending south to the Georgia state line were contracted in July 1959 and dedicated on May 31, 1961. The concurrent segment with I-40 between the split near Lenoir City and Downtown Knoxville opened to traffic on December 2, 1961. On December 7, 1962, the short stretch between I-24 and SR 320 opened. The route was completed through Chattanooga on July 17, 1963, with the completion of the  segment between SR 320 and the Summit Bypass north of US 11/US 64 (Bonny Oaks Drive). The short segment between US 321/SR 95 in Lenoir City and the split with I-40 was completed on December 1, 1963. The last segment of what was then I-75 in Knoxville to open was the  segment concurrent with I-40 between Liberty Street and Unaka Street on December 4, 1964. The section between Ooltewah and SR 60 in Cleveland opened on October 18, 1966. Like much of the Interstate Highway System in rural Tennessee, priority was generally given to completing rural segments in Middle and West Tennessee over East Tennessee, but the last approximately  segment of I-75 in Tennessee, located mostly in Campbell County, was constructed much earlier than most of the rural segments in Tennessee, reportedly due to the influence of then-Representative and later Senator Howard Baker, who was from that area. By 1963, the  section between US 25W in Jellico and the Kentucky state line was open to traffic. The concurrent segment with US 25W, located between Rocky Top (then Lake City) and Caryville, was completed in October 1964. Portions of this segment predated the Interstate System.

The  section between US 25W/SR 63 in Caryville and US 25W in Jellico was opened to traffic on October 22, 1968. The  segment in Rocky Top, located between US 441 and US 25W, opened on September 1, 1970. In December 1970, the  segment between US 25W/I-640 and SR 131 (an approximately  portion of which is now I-275) opened. The section between SR 60 and SR 308 in Bradley County began construction in 1968 but was stalled shortly thereafter. Construction resumed in 1972, and the segment was opened to traffic on January 23, 1973. The section between US 25W north of Knoxville and SR 61 in Clinton broke ground in segments, beginning in August 1968, and was opened to traffic on August 1, 1972. The approximately  segment between SR 61 in Clinton and US 441 in Rocky Top was completed in September 1973. The section of the highway between SR 308 near Charleston and SR 30 in Athens opened on December 24, 1973, and was completed the following Spring. The last sections of I-40 and I-81 in Tennessee were opened on this same day.

I-75 originally continued into Downtown Knoxville then turned to the north at Malfunction Junction, following what is now signed as I-275. When the western section of I-640 was completed in 1980, I-75 was moved to overlap the it to divert through traffic away from downtown in preparation for the 1982 World's Fair. This concurrency is somewhat unusual in that the exit numbers, and milemarkers follow the auxiliary route I-640 instead of I-75 mileage.

Fog hazards

An approximately  section of I-75 in northern Bradley and southern McMinn counties, including the bridge over the Hiwassee River, is prone to hazards from dense fog in the morning, which can severely obscure the visibility of drivers. This segment is located near several heavy industries including the Resolute Forest Products paper mill, formerly Bowater, which operates settling ponds along the Interstate. This segment has been the site of several serious multivehicle accidents, the first of which occurred on March 9, 1974, less than three months after the section opened to traffic, and before it had been declared complete. This accident involved 18 vehicles, killing three and injuring 10. A total of six multivehicle accidents occurred along this stretch in the 1970s. The worst, which took place on November 5, 1978, involved 62 vehicles and injured 46, and took place on the Hiwassee River Bridge. After a multivehicle accident on April 15, 1979, that involved 18 vehicles, killed three, and injured 14, the Tennessee Department of Transportation (TDOT) identified the stretch as prone to fog hazards and agreed to install warning signs with flashing lights, which would activate if fog was detected. After this, no serious fog related accidents occurred for more than 11 years.

On December 11, 1990, a 99-vehicle accident occurred in this same area, causing 12 deaths and 56 injuries. Extensive investigations followed, and several lawsuits were filed against Bowater, alleging that they had contributed to the fog with their water vapor emissions, and the state of Tennessee, alleging that TDOT had failed to install adequate warning systems along this stretch of I-75. The existing fog warning lights were reportedly not working the day of the accident. After settling with the family members of accident victims and survivors in court, TDOT instituted several safety measures along this stretch of highway, including re-striping the roadway with extra markings to make it more visible and installing a computerized fog detection system, which contains a warning system with flashing lights, electronic signs, variable speed limits, and electronic controlled swing gates which block access to the Interstate from six entrance ramps in and near this stretch in the event of dense fog. Between mileposts 31 and 39, the highway is designated as a fog advisory zone. The $4.5-million (equivalent to $ in ) system began operation in December 1993, and, in 2006, a $6.6-million (equivalent to $ in ) upgrade was completed which installed video cameras. Bowater also agreed to limit the use of their settling pond closest to the Interstate. The accident was profiled in a 1997 episode of the show Forensic Files.

Geological difficulties
The entire section of I-75 in Tennessee north of Knoxville has been subject to many geological difficulties, particularly the last  through the Cumberland Mountains.

In March 2005, the southbound lanes of Interstate 75 were shut down between milemarkers 141 to 143 due to a rockslide below the roadway that caused the pavement to partially collapse.

In March 2012, the southbound lanes of the Interstate were again closed to traffic between milemarkers 141 and 143 in Campbell County, Tennessee due to a slide beneath the roadway. This was later followed by a second slide in early May 2012 that caused a portion of the southbound lanes to completely erode and forced the detour lanes to be closed.

In February 2016, a rock slide closed I-75 near Caryville.

Other incidents
On March 28, 1994, a runaway barge that had broken loose from its mooring due to flooding struck the I-75 bridge over the Tennessee River, along with the US 11 bridge and a railroad bridge. The collision broke loose a chunk of concrete from a post, but engineers determined that it caused no major structural damage. I-75 had been closed to traffic on this section in preparation for the collision.

On April 1, 2019, part of the bridge on I-75 southbound over the ramp from I-24 westbound to I-75 northbound at the split in Chattanooga collapsed, injuring one person and blocking traffic for hours. The bridge, built in 1959, is one of the oldest on I-75 in Tennessee, and the interchange is the site of frequent accidents. TDOT's chief engineer said that the collapse was most likely caused by weakening of the bridge's rail that occurred when an illegally oversized load hit the bridge.

Improvements
Throughout its history, I-75 has seen many reconstruction and widening projects in Tennessee.

TDOT first proposed to widen the concurrent segment with I-40 between the Pellissippi Parkway and I-640 to eight lanes in early 1981, which was subsequently approved by the Federal Highway Administration (FHWA) on October 9, 1986. However, TDOT initially chose to widen the section between the split with I-40 near Lenoir City and I-640 from four to six lanes, which took place in the earlier to mid-1980s. Between 1990 and 2006, a series of projects widened the segment between SR 131 and I-640 and reconstructed multiple interchanges along this segment.

I-75 was widened from four to six and eight lanes in Chattanooga between the interchange with I-24 and SR 153 in the early 1990s. Between 1998 and 2010, a series of projects reconstructed and widened I-75 between SR 153 and north of US 11/US 64 in Ooltewah. The first of these projects, which began in late 1998 and was completed in 2001, rebuilt the interchange with SR 153, changing the approach of two flyover ramps that connect to I-75 northbound from the left to the right side of the road. This project also modified the interchange with SR 320, removing two cloverleaf loop ramps from I-75 southbound and moving the access to the entrance ramp from I-75 southbound to a point near the interchange with SR 153. The next project, which widened I-75 further between mileposts 6 and 9 and improved the interchange with SR 317, was completed in November 2005. A new interchange was constructed in 2006 to provide access to the Enterprise South Industrial Park, which at that time was in the process of redevelopment.  This interchange, which became exit 9, now provides access to the Volkswagen Chattanooga Assembly Plant and was not opened until 2010. A segment of SR 317 was later routed onto a concurrency of I-75 between exit 11 and this interchange. Exit 9 was designated as the Bredesen–Ramsey Interchange in 2015 in honor of the efforts of then-Governor Phil Bredesen and county Mayor Claude Ramsey to bring Volkswagen to Chattanooga. The last of these projects, which began on November 8, 2007, widened I-75 from approximately mileposts 10 to 13, just north of the interchange of US 11/US 64, and included reconstruction of this interchange, including the addition of a loop ramp, and improvements on this road. This project was completed on August 12, 2010, four months ahead of schedule.

On May 1, 2008, I-75 northbound traffic was rerouted back along its original path in Downtown Knoxville along I-275 as part of SmartFix 40, a major construction project that includes closing a portion of I-40. Traffic was rerouted along I-275 as the ramp from I-640 eastbound/I-75 northbound to I-75 northbound is only one lane which causes traffic delays at peak times.

In December 2018, a contract was awarded to rebuild the interchange with I-24 in Chattanooga, with preliminary work beginning in May 2019. The project consisted of eliminating left-hand entrance and exit ramps from I-75 onto I-24, straightening curves, widening I-75 to six lanes through the interchange, widening two ramps from I-75 to I-24 to three lanes, replacing two overpass bridges, and construction of a collector–distributor facility that carries traffic directly from US 41 and the Tennessee welcome center along I-75 southbound, providing direct access to both I-75 southbound and I-24 westbound. Additional space was also provided to widen the remaining ramps between I-75 and I-24 to three lanes, which will be done in the second phase. The project was completed on August 19, 2021, at a cost of $133.5 million, making it the second-most expensive individual contract in state history at the time.

Future
In the mid-1990s, a freeway, referred to as SR 475 (with the intent of being renamed I-475), was proposed as an outer beltway around Knoxville, running north of the city between I-75/I-40 near Farragut, and I-40 near Sevierville. A number of studies were conducted on the proposed route, but the entire project was canceled on June 25, 2010.

TDOT has approved the widening of several segments of I-75 in Tennessee from four to six lanes, including the approximately  segment between US 11/US 64 in Ooltewah and APD-40 in Cleveland, the  segment between SR 323 near Philadelphia and the interchange with I-40 near Lenoir City, and the  segment between SR 131 near Powell and SR 170.

Exit list
The exits north of Knoxville are numbered based on I-75's original path through Downtown Knoxville along I-40 and I-275.

See also

References

External links

 Tennessee
75
Transportation in Hamilton County, Tennessee
Transportation in Bradley County, Tennessee
Transportation in McMinn County, Tennessee
Transportation in Monroe County, Tennessee
Transportation in Loudon County, Tennessee
Transportation in Knox County, Tennessee
Transportation in Anderson County, Tennessee
Transportation in Campbell County, Tennessee